Asif Panhwar was the General Secretary of the Jeay Sindh Student Federation JSMM and the son of Faiz Muhammad Panhwar. He was abducted by intelligence agencies of Pakistan and then killed.

References

Year of birth missing
Year of death missing
History of Sindh
Leaders of the Pakistan Movement
Assassinated activists
Pakistan Movement activists